BGIA may refer to:
 Ikerasak Heliport by ICAO code
 Institute for Occupational Safety and Health of the German Social Accident Insurance

de:BGIA